The 1978 Texas A&M Aggies football team represented Texas A&M University in the 1978 NCAA Division I-A football season as a member of the Southwest Conference (SWC). The Aggies were led by head coach Emory Bellard in his seventh season through the first six games before his resignation on October 24. Tom Wilson was named interim coach and led the Aggies in their final six games. and finished with a record of eight wins and four losses (8–4 overall, 4–4 in the SWC) and with a victory in the Hall of Fame Classic.

Schedule

Roster

References

Texas AandM
Texas A&M Aggies football seasons
All-American Bowl champion seasons
Texas AandM Aggies football